Gerson Luis García Gálvez (born 24 April 1985 in Sucre, Bolivia) is a Bolivian football defender  who currently plays for first division team Universitario de Sucre..

External links
 
 Profile at Boliviagol

1985 births
Living people
People from Oruro, Bolivia
Association football defenders
Bolivian footballers
Club San José players
Club Real Potosí players
The Strongest players
C.D. Jorge Wilstermann players
Nacional Potosí players